Mutabad (also Romanized as Mūtābād and Mowt Abad) is a village in Masumiyeh Rural District, in the Central District of Arak County, Markazi Province, Iran. As of the 2006 census, its population was 555, in 175 families.

References 

Populated places in Arak County